A special edition is a term used as a marketing incentive for various kinds of products.

Special Edition may also refer to:

 "A Special Edition", a 1997 episode of The Outer Limits
 Special Edition (film), a 1938 British film
 Special Edition (Infamous Mobb album), 2002
 Special Edition (Jack DeJohnette album), 1980